Carnation is a brand of food products. The brand was especially known for its evaporated milk product created in 1899, then called Carnation Sterilized Cream and later called  Carnation Evaporated Milk.  The brand has since been used for other related products including milk-flavoring mixes, flavored beverages, flavor syrups, hot cocoa mixes, instant breakfasts, corn flakes, ice cream novelties, and dog food. Nestlé acquired the Carnation Company in 1985.

History

Carnation was founded as an evaporated milk company, but demand decreased with the increasing availability of home refrigeration throughout the 20th century. Carnation diversified its product portfolio after the 1950s and was acquired by Nestlé in 1984 for $3 billion ($ in  dollars ).

Elbridge Amos Stuart 
Elbridge Amos Stuart (born 10 September 1856 in Guilford County, North Carolina; died 14 January 1944 in Los Angeles, California) was an American milk industrialist and creator of Carnation evaporated milk and its famous slogan, that it came from "Contented Cows".

On 6 September 1899, Stuart and a business partner founded the Pacific Coast Condensed Milk Company in Kent, Washington, and he became its first president (a post he held until 1932, then serving as chairman from 1932 to 1944). Its product was based on the relatively new process of commercial evaporation of beverages. Stuart believed that there was value in sanitary milk at a time when fresh milk was neither universally available nor always drinkable, and correctly believed that his product would join other staples on grocers' shelves.

In 1901, his partner sold out, leaving Stuart the company and $105,000 of debt ($ in  dollars ).  As sales gradually grew, Stuart sought a brand name for the product. Passing a tobacconist's window in downtown Seattle, Stuart saw a display of cigars around a sign with the name: Carnation. His own firm subsequently adopted the name Carnation Evaporated Milk Company.

One of the most important things Stuart had learned on his father's farm was that high-quality milk came from healthy cows; so to ensure premium standards, he distributed pure bred bulls to the farmers supplying the factory, whose offspring were selected for milk productivity. Eventually, Stuart established a breeding farm, named Carnation Farm, where the application of new principles of husbandry continually improved the productivity of the herd. Carnation cows held the world milk production record for 32 consecutive years. One cow in particular, Segis Pietertje Prospect, produced 37,381 pints of milk during 1920, and a statue of the cow was erected to honour this record. The town of Tolt, Washington, was later renamed Carnation, after the nearby breeding and research farms.

Advertising 
In 1907, the promotional phrase "Carnation Condensed Milk, the milk from contented cows" was introduced. This slogan referred to the higher quality milk from happy cows grazing in the lush Pacific Northwest. Carnation used this slogan for decades, and it spawned a radio variety program entitled "The Contented Hour," which featured entertainers such as Dinah Shore, Jane Powell and Burns and Allen. The George Burns and Gracie Allen Show, which premiered on CBS television in 1950, was sponsored by Carnation. As was common during that era, instead of cutting to filmed commercials, Burns, Allen and guests broke the "fourth wall" to tout Carnation products in a comedic, often tongue-in-cheek way during the show.

Since the 1960s, labels of cans of Carnation Condensed Milk have contained recipes on the inner side.

Rhymes
During the twentieth century, Carnation Evaporated Milk became the subject of humorous, satirical rhymes. One example that may date back to the year 1900 is as follows: Carnation Milk is the best in the land / Here I sit with a can in my hand / No tits to pull, no hay to pitch / You just punch a hole in the son of a bitch.  This quatrain, or a variant of it, has often been portrayed by storytellers as the result of a slogan contest or advertising contest sponsored by the Carnation Company, although such a contest never actually occurred.

Current status 
The site of the original Carnation Farms is located 45 minutes east of Seattle, in Carnation, Washington.

In 2006, Nestlé sold the liquid milk business within Malaysia, Singapore, Brunei and Thailand, including the Carnation brand to F&N.

In the Philippines in 2007, under a separate agreement with Alaska Milk Corporation (a subsidiary of FrieslandCampina), Nestlé provided Alaska the long-term license to manufacture and sell Carnation Evaporated Creamer, Carnation Condensada and Milkmaid Sweetened Condensed Milk, under the Nestlé quality guidelines in the Philippines. This trademark license lasted for 14 years until 2021 as Nestlé Philippines reacquired the trademark licenses for the Carnation and Milkmaid brands.

In 2008, Carnation Farms became Camp Korey, part of the Hole in the Wall Camps founded by Paul Newman. Camp Korey is a medically supervised camp staffed with physicians and nurses, and trained camp counsellors for children living with serious and life-threatening illness. The camp provides a week-long experience of camp programs and activities for children ages 7–16 at no cost to them. In 2016, Camp Korey moved from Carnation Farm to property purchased in Skagit County, and the Stuart family, who bought back the farm from Nestle, is developing new programs and activities for the farm.

Products
Carnation Evaporated Milk  introduced in 1899
Carnation Malted Milk  introduced in 1927
Carnation Instant Breakfast (Breakfast Essentials)  introduced in 1964

Carnation Café at Disneyland

The Carnation Café is now a fast casual restaurant in Disneyland and other Disney parks, originally "Carnation Ice Cream Parlor and Restaurant presented by Carnation" (original attraction from the park's opening in 1955).

In popular culture
For the scene in the 1975 film Jaws in which the character Ben Gardner's corpse pops out from his stationary boat, director Steven Spielberg re-shot the scene in the swimming pool of editor Verna Fields. Spielberg poured Carnation's powdered milk into the pool in order to simulate the murky waters of Martha's Vineyard where the scene was originally shot.

Elbridge Amos Stuart is immortalized in folk musician John Stewart's 1969 song "Mother Country".

See also 

 Carnation, Washington
 Condensed milk – A different type of preserved milk
 Eagle Family Foods Incorporated – a rival company
 Ovaltine - a rival brand also owned by Nestlé
 Pet, Inc. – another rival
 List of chocolate beverages
 List of dairy product companies in the United States

References

External links 

 Official web site
 Condensed milk history from CooksInfo.com, the food encyclopedia.

Chocolate drinks
Ice cream brands
Nestlé brands
Dairy products companies of the United States
Companies based in Kent, Washington
Defunct companies based in Washington (state)
1985 mergers and acquisitions
Carnation Ice Cream Parlor and Restaurant